Uralipatti is a Panchayat village in Natham taluk, Dindigul district, Tamil Nadu, India.  Its population was 3662 in 2001.

Industry
The main income of the village is derived from agriculture; crops such as cotton or rice are commonly grown.

Demographics
 India census, Uralipatti had a population of 3662 consisting of 1846 (50.41 %) males and  1816 (49.59%) females. In Uralipatti, 1871 citizens are considered literate (males 59.5%, females 61.46%) with an average literacy rate of 51.09%.  This is less than the national average of 59.5%.  Demographics indicate that 12.31% of the population is under 6 years of age.

Culture
The Tamil culture is Pandiya's era and the language style is different from other districts. Uralipatti has a Muthalamman Temple which conducts annual rituals that are famous in the village. The festivals during the season include people performing various activities to Amman viz – Pal Kodam, carrying fire pots, etc. In and around Uralipatti there are a considerable number of Muslims. The Christian population is comparatively low.
Churches, Masjid are available. All festivals are celebrated well with people of Uralipatti.

Schools
Panchayat Primary School, Uralipatti, is the oldest school in Natham taluk (More than 100 Years Old).
Sarva Seva Middle School, Etayampatti
St. Josephs R.C. Primary School, Appaspuram
Panchayat Primary School, Erakapatti
Sarva Seva Primary School, Kathampatti

References

Villages in Dindigul district